Christián Yantani Garcés (born 8 August 1975 in Valdivia) is a Chilean rower.

Notes

References

External links 
 
 
 

1975 births
Living people
Chilean male rowers
Olympic rowers of Chile
People from Valdivia
Rowers at the 2000 Summer Olympics
World Rowing Championships medalists for Chile
Pan American Games medalists in rowing
Pan American Games gold medalists for Chile
Pan American Games bronze medalists for Chile
Rowers at the 1999 Pan American Games
Rowers at the 2003 Pan American Games
Chilean people of Arab descent
Medalists at the 1999 Pan American Games
20th-century Chilean people
21st-century Chilean people